The Rural Municipality of Mankota No. 45 is a rural municipality (RM) in the Canadian province of Saskatchewan within  Division No. 3. Located in the southwest portion of the province, it is adjacent to the United States border, neighbouring Valley County and Phillips County in Montana.

History 
The RM of Mankota No. 45 incorporated as a rural municipality on January 1, 1913.

Geography

Communities and localities 
The following urban municipalities are surrounded by the RM.

Villages
 Mankota

The following unincorporated communities are within the RM.

Organized hamlets
 McCord

Localities
 Billimun
 Ferland
 Horse Creek
 McEachern
 Milly
 Summercove
 Wideview

Demographics 

Government 
The RM of Mankota No. 45 is governed by an elected municipal council and an appointed administrator that meets on the second Tuesday of every month. The reeve of the RM is Calvin Gavelin while its administrator is Debra Shaw. The RM's office is located in Mankota.

Transportation 
 Highway 18
 Highway 19
 Highway 611

See also 
 List of rural municipalities in Saskatchewan

References 

M

Division No. 3, Saskatchewan